Prasophyllum calcicola, commonly known as the limestone leek orchid, is a species of orchid endemic to Australia. It has a single, smooth, tube-shaped leaf and up to twelve yellowish-green flowers on an erect flowering stem. It is found in coastal areas of Western Australia and South Australia growing on soils derived from limestone.

Description
Between three and twelve or more flowers are arranged on a flowering spike. As with others in the genus, the flowers are inverted so that the labellum is above the column rather than below it. Flowering occurs in September and October.

Taxonomy and naming
Prasophyllum calcicola was first formally described in 1989 by Robert Bates and the description was published in Journal of the Adelaide Botanic Garden from a specimen collected in the Warrenben Conservation Park. The specific epithet (calcicola) is derived from the Latin words calx meaning "limestone"  and -cola meaning "dweller", referring to the usual habitat of this species.

Distribution and habitat
The limestone leek orchid grows in coastal areas in calcareous sand and near limestone. It occurs between north of Geraldton and Israelite Bay in Western Australia and in the south-east of South Australia.

Conservation
This orchid is classified as "not threatened" by the Western Australian Government Department of Parks and Wildlife.

References

External links 
 

calcicola
Flora of South Australia
Flora of Western Australia
Plants described in 1989
Endemic orchids of Australia